The New Zealand men's national field hockey team, also known as the Black Sticks Men, is the national team for men's field hockey of New Zealand, under the New Zealand Hockey Federation.

At the 1976 Summer Olympics in Montreal, they upset Australia to win gold, becoming the first non-Asian/European team to clinch the gold medal. They have also won silver and bronze at the 2002 and 2010 Commonwealth Games.

Tournament history

Summer Olympics
1956 – 6th place
1960 – 5th place
1964 – 13th place
1968 – 7th place
1972 – 9th place
1976 – 
1984 – 7th place
1992 – 8th place
2004 – 6th place
2008 – 7th place
2012 – 9th place
2016 – 7th place
2020 – 9th place

World Cup
1973 – 7th place
1975 – 7th place
1982 – 7th place
1986 – 9th place
1998 – 10th place
2002 – 9th place
2006 – 8th place
2010 – 9th place
2014 – 7th place
2018 – 9th place
2023 – 7th place

Commonwealth Games
 1998 – 6th place
 2002 – 
 2006 – 5th place
 2010 – 
 2014 – 4th place
 2018 – 
 2022 – 5th place

World League
 2012–13 – 
 2014–15 – 11th place
 2016–17 – 12th place

Pro League
 2019 – 8th place
 2020–21 – 8th place
 2021–22 – Withdrew
 2022–23 – Qualified

Champions Trophy
 1978 – 4th place
 1983 – 6th place
 1984 – 5th place
 2004 – 6th place
 2010 – 5th place
 2011 – 4th place
 2012 – 7th place

Champions Challenge
 2003 – 4th place
 2007 – 
 2009 – 
 2014 – 5th place

Oceania Cup
 1999 – 
 2001 – 
 2003 – 
 2005 – 
 2007 – 
 2009 – 
 2011 – 
 2013 – 
 2015 – 
 2017 – 
 2019 – 
 2023 – Qualified

Sultan Azlan Shah Cup
 1991 – 4th place
 1995 – 
 1996 – 4th place
 1998 – 6th place
 2000 – 6th place
 2003 –  
 2005 – 4th place
 2006 – 4th place
 2008 – 
 2009 – 
 2011 – 4th place
 2012 – 
 2013 – 4th place
 2015 – 
 2016 – 
 2017 – 4th place

Team

Current squad
The following 18 players were named on 7 December 2022 for the 2023 World Cup  from 13 to 29 January 2023 in Bhubaneswar and Rourkela, India.

Head coach:  Greg Nicol

Notable players

Paul Ackerley
Scott Anderson
Jeff Archibald
Ryan Archibald
Phil Burrows
Simon Child
Tony Ineson
Ramesh Patel
Hayden Shaw
Nick Wilson
Selwyn Maister
Barry Maister
Brett Leaver
Trevor Manning
Jamie Smith
Peter Daji
Campbell Garry
Austen Haig
Richard Clouston
Marc Keil
Cooper Gilmore
Fred Meehan

References

External links

FIH profile

Oceanian men's national field hockey teams
National team
Field hockey
Men's sport in New Zealand